In algebra, Pfister's sixteen-square identity is a non-bilinear identity of form

It was first proven to exist by H. Zassenhaus and W. Eichhorn in the 1960s, and independently by Albrecht Pfister around the same time. There are several versions, a concise one of which is

The  are

and,

The identity shows that, in general, the product of two sums of sixteen squares is the sum of sixteen rational squares. Incidentally, the  also obey,

No sixteen-square identity exists involving only bilinear functions since Hurwitz's theorem states an identity of the form

There are also non-bilinear versions of Euler's four-square and Degen's eight-square identities.

See also
 Brahmagupta–Fibonacci identity
 Euler's four-square identity
 Degen's eight-square identity
 Sedenions

References

External links
Pfister's 16-Square Identity

Analytic number theory
Mathematical identities